Emmanuelle de Villepin (born 1959) is a French writer. She was the recipient of the Rapallo Carige Prize for La vita che scorre in 2014.

References

1959 births
Living people
French women novelists
21st-century French women writers
21st-century French novelists
French expatriates in Italy